Project Healthy Children (PHC) is a nonprofit organization based in Westborough that works closely with governments in developing countries to provide technical assistance for supporting the design and implementation of food fortification programs in developing countries.  In these developing countries, it helps add micronutrients (such as folic acid, iodine, and iron) to fortify foods such as flour, sugar, rice, and oil in order to tackle micronutrient deficiency in developing countries.

It was started by David M. Dodson and Stephanie Dodson Cornell and initially targeted to help fortify food with folic acid to benefit Honduran children, after a trip to Honduras in 2000 where they became aware of the malnutrition problem in Honduras and of the cost-effectiveness of food fortification. In 2008, Project Healthy Children went into Rwanda in order to deal with anemia and goiter. In 2010 PHC helped set up a National Fortification Alliance.

It is listed as a top charity by Giving What We Can.

Reviews

Giving What We Can review

Giving What We Can (GWWC) published a detailed review of PHC, along with a case study of its food fortification efforts in Rwanda. Based on this, GWWC listed PHC among its two promising charities, alongside the Deworm the World Initiative (but below the established charities Against Malaria Foundation and Schistosomiasis Control Initiative.

PHC was first added to GWWC's list of top charities on May 16, 2013. Explaining the decision to add them, GWWC's Robert Wiblin wrote that PHC was pursuing a promising, low-cost, high-upside approach and seemed to have strong overall competency at executing it. PHC's status as a promising charity was re-affirmed in GWWC's 2014 end-of-year recommendations. In September 2015, GWWC published an update on PHC's activities.

GiveWell review

Charity evaluator GiveWell initially contacted PHC in 2011 but PHC declined to participate in GiveWell's review process. In 2015, GiveWell resumed conversation with PHC, which was now aspiring to be a GiveWell top-rated charity. GiveWell also published conversation notes with Laura Rowe, the Chief Operating Officer, from February 19, 2015.

GiveWell published a new review in September 2016, and indicated that PHC was applying for top charity status. The review stated: "If successful, it seems plausible that micronutrient fortification programs such as those supported by PHC could be as cost-effective as our other priority programs." However, the GiveWell review highlighted the following major sources of uncertainty that had held GiveWell back from doing a formal cost-effectiveness analysis so far:

 Magnitude of health benefits of micronutrient fortification
 Whether foods are being fortified at appropriate levels
 Attributing impact to PHC
 PHC's future plans (specifically, that they might change focus in 2017)

References

External links

Health charities in the United States
Charities based in Massachusetts